David Stuart McGregor VC (16 October 1895 – 22 October 1918) was a Scottish recipient of the Victoria Cross, the highest and most prestigious award for gallantry in the face of the enemy that can be awarded to British and Commonwealth forces.  A soldier with The Royal Scots during the First World War, he was posthumously awarded the VC for his actions on 22 October 1918, during the Hundred Days Offensive.

Early life
David Stuart McGregor was born on 16 October 1895 in Corstorphine, to the west of Edinburgh. His father, also named David, was in the clothing trade. Educated at George Watson's College and then George Heriot's School, in 1911 he began working at the Commercial Bank of Scotland. Two years later he joined the Territorial Force, serving in the Midlothian Royal Field Artillery.

First World War
Following the outbreak of the First World War, McGregor enlisted in the British Army. He was commissioned into the 6th Battalion, Royal Scots. He was initially sent to Egypt but by 1916 was serving on the Western Front. After receiving specialist training, he was posted to the Machine Gun Corps (MGC).

On 22 October 1918, during the Hundred Days Offensive, McGregor, attached to the MGC's 29th Battalion, 29th Division, was commanding a section of machine guns in support of a battalion advancing near Hoogemolen, in Belgium. However, the battalion came under heavy machine gun fire from a nearby hill which stopped further movement forward. Despite being under fire, McGregor was instrumental in getting the advance restarted by bringing forward his guns and directing their fire onto the Germans until he was killed. For his actions on 22 October he was posthumously awarded the Victoria Cross (VC). The VC, instituted in 1856, was the highest award for valour that could be bestowed on a soldier of the British Empire. The citation for McGregor's VC read: 

McGregor's body was recovered and he is buried in the Stasegem Communal Cemetery in West Flanders, four kilometres to the east of Kortrijk. A memorial stone and plaque on the boundary of George Heriot's School, at the junction of Lauriston Place and Heriot Place, was unveiled on the 100th anniversary of his death, 22 October 2018.

Victoria Cross
King George V presented McGregor's VC to his parents on 15 February 1919, in a ceremony at Buckingham Palace. In 1976, his VC was donated to the Royal Scots and is displayed at the Royal Scots Museum in Edinburgh Castle, Scotland.

Notes

References

1895 births
1918 deaths
British Army personnel of World War I
British World War I recipients of the Victoria Cross
Royal Scots officers
British military personnel killed in World War I
Military personnel from Edinburgh
Machine Gun Corps officers
British Army recipients of the Victoria Cross
People educated at George Heriot's School